Acanthogethes is a genus of pollen beetles in the family Nitidulidae. There are about five described species in Acanthogethes.

Species
These five species belong to the genus Acanthogethes:
 Acanthogethes brevis Sturm, 1845
 Acanthogethes fuscus (Olivier, 1790)
 Acanthogethes hercules (Audisio, 1986)
 Acanthogethes lamii (Rosenhauer, 1856)
 Acanthogethes reyi (Guillebeau, 1885)

References

Further reading

 
 
 

Nitidulidae
Articles created by Qbugbot